Walter Henry Erskine, Earl of Mar and of Kellie (17 December 1839 – 16 September 1888) was a Scottish peer.

Biography
Walter Henry was the son of Walter Coningsby Erskine, 12th Earl of Kellie and Elise Youngson. He succeeded as 13th Earl of Kellie  on his father's death in 1872. Coningsby Erskine had pursued a claim for succession to the earldom of Mar which was unresolved on his death, but this claim was recognized in 1875 making Walter Henry the Earl of Mar also. However, this was modified in 1885 by a special Act of Parliament, limiting the claim to the seventh creation of the title, leaving Walter the 11th Earl of Mar concurrently with John Goodeve-Erskine, who was 27th Earl of Mar in its first creation. There have thereafter been two earls of Mar at any one time. 

On 14 October 1853, he married Mary Anne Forbes (1838–22 May 1927), daughter of William Forbes. They had nine children.

Walter John Francis Erskine, 12th Earl of Mar and 14th Earl of Kellie (1865–1955)
Elyne Mary Erskine (1866–1891)
Constance Elise Erskine (1869–1959)
Rt. Hon. Sir William Augustus Forbes Erskine (1871–1952)
Mary Erskine (1872–1873)
Louisa Frances Erskine (b. 1875)
Frances Elizabeth Erskine (b. 1877)
Alice Maud Mary Erskine (b. 1878)
Alexander Penrose Forbes Erskine (1881–1925)

Kellie, Walter Erskine, Earl of Mar and
13
1839 births
1888 deaths
Scottish representative peers
Walter